Amritpur is a prominent town and one of three tehsils in Farrukhabad district of Uttar Pradesh state in northern India. The other two tehsils are Farrukhabad and Kaimganj. Amritpur tehsil was created from Rajepur Block after the district was split in 1997.

Transport 
The nearest railway stations are at Farrukhabad and Fatehgarh. The nearest airport is Amausi Airport.

Geography
It has an average elevation of 136 metres (449 feet). The town has an alluvial fertile soil. Farmers here perform farming activities year round. Potato, sugercane and other vegetables are produced in the area. Rainfall is around 25 cm per year.

External links
Amritpur

Amritsar, India - Golden Temple

Cities and towns in Farrukhabad district